Count Francesco Zambeccari (1752 - 21 September 1812) was an Italian aviation pioneer.  He was killed in a ballooning accident.

Zambeccari was born in Bologna in 1752, son of Senator Giacomo Zambeccari. He studied at the Collegio dei nobili in Parma and then enlisted in the Guardia Real in Spain and served in the Spanish Navy.  He fled from the Spanish Inquisition, and was in Paris in 1783 where he observed the first unmanned balloon flights by the Montgolfier brothers.

He then moved to London and launched the first unmanned balloon in Britain on 4 November 1783, a year before the first manned flight in England by Vincent Lunardi, releasing a  hydrogen balloon from the house of Michael Biaggini, a maker of artificial flowers made from silk and other fabrics, at 33 Noble Street, on Cheapside. The balloon was later found by a farmer at Waltham Abbey. Biaggini released an even larger  balloon from Grosvenor Square in January 1784. Zambeccari was commissioned to launch a balloon in Venice in April 1784, an occasion that was painted by Francesco Guardi. He also collaborated with Vincent Lunardi before Lunardi's first manned flight in England on 15 September 1784. Zambeccari and Admiral Sir Edward Vernon ascended in a  balloon from Tottenham Court Road on 23 March 1785 and landed later the same day near Horsham. The balloon was later displayed at the Lyceum. He also flew from Norwich later that year.

Zambeccari moved to St Petersburg in 1787 and served in the Russian Imperial Navy.  He was captured by the Turks in 1787 and held prisoner in Constantinople for over two years.  His freedom was secured by the Spanish ambassador.

He returned to Bologna, and married Diamante Negrini.  They had three children, including Livio Zambeccari.

He spent the rest of his life experimenting with balloons, generally using a combination of a hot air balloon and hydrogen balloon known as a rozière after Jean-François Pilâtre de Rozier.  He sought a method of steering using rudders or oars.  He published a five-volume work on ballooning in London in 1803.

He and his companions were rescued from the Adriatic Sea, twice, in 1803 and 1804. The government of Bologna sponsored a flight in 1803. Bad weather caused the flight to be postponed in September 1803. Wanting to avoid a second postponement, the balloon took off in bad weather on 7 October. In bad visibility, the balloon crashed into the Adriatic Sea early the following morning. Similarly, another flight with Andreoli on 23 August 1804 also crashed into the Adriatic Sea.

Zambeccari died in September 1812, when his balloon caught fire after an unsuccessful landing attempt.  His companion, Bonaga, survived.  He was buried in the family tomb in the Basilica of San Francesco.  His remains were moved to the Certosa di Bologna in 1813, but returned to San Francesco in 1926 to be interred with his son Livio in the monument to his relation Alessandro Zambeccari.

References
 Zambeccari and his two companions in the Adriatic (1804), early flight collecting card, ca. 1895
 Von Zeppelin's Forgotten Predecessor. Zambeccari's Wonderful Airship in 1803, from Scientific American (1908)
  Count Zambeccari's balloon, Smithsonian Learning Lab
 Count Francesco Zambeccari, Sir Edward Vernon and Miss Grice in a hot air balloon at Tottenham Court Road, on March 23rd 1785, British Library
 Flying's Strangest Moments, John Harding, p. 24-25
 London Magazine, December 1783, p. 502
 The Papers of Benjamin Franklin: Volume 41, p. 229-230
 Francesco Zambeccari, Aeronauta (1752-1812) by Timina Guasti Caproni, Claremont
 Zambeccari Francesco, Storia e Memoria di Bologna
 Broadsheet advertising Zambeccari's balloon, 1785 , Science Museum
 Ballooning: A History, 1782-1900, By S.L. Kotar, J.E. Gessler, p. 71
 Guardi's Balloon, The Brooklyn Rail, 5 November 2014

1756 births
1812 deaths
Italian balloonists